The Smith Point Bridge is a steel bascule drawbridge in Shirley, New York that connects Long Island to Fire Island. Located on the south shore of central Suffolk County, the bridge carries William Floyd Parkway (Suffolk CR 46) across The Narrows between Bellport Bay (an arm of the Great South Bay) and Moriches Bay. It connects Long Island with Smith Point County Park and the Otis Pike Fire Island High Dune Wilderness, both are a part of the Fire Island National Seashore.

History 

The bridge derives its name from Smith Point which is a peninsula on the Long Island mainland sticking into Bellport Bay which in turn was named for William "Tangier" Smith who in the 17th century owned 50 miles of ocean front property in the Manor St. George.

In 1916, Fredrick J. Quimby paid for construction of the first Tangier Bridge at Smith Point.  It was a wooden footbridge with an engine driven drawbridge.  It replaced boat access to Tangier Manor and Quimby's oceanfront development, intended to be a resort town to compete with Atlantic City.  Early in 1917, 200 feet in the center of the bridge, including the bascule draw and all its machinery, was destroyed by an ice jam. Subsequent winter storms continued to ravage the remains of the bridge.  The few subsequent wooden bridges built to varying degrees of stability over the years were all destroyed by winter ice floes.

In 1926, caravans of camels and horses passed over the bridge for the filming of The Son of the Sheik starring Rudolf Valentino and Vilma Banky. 

The last wooden footbridge washed away in 1927, and no new bridges were constructed for another 32 years. 

In summer 1955, the Shirley-Mastic Chamber of Commerce broke ground and invited 12,000 people to initiate the building of the new Smith Point Bridge to Fire Island. The bridge opened on July 4, 1959. The bridge that spans one-quarter mile represented the first step by Suffolk County to preserve 810 miles of shore frontage for public purposes. The bridge project was the development of Smith Point County Park, with a beach frontage of 6,000 feet along the eastern side of Fire Island Barrier Island on Atlantic Ocean.   The park includes bathing and camping facilities. The entire structure was built on concrete piles, with a reinforced concrete roadway laid on a steel beam superstructure.

Structural Specifications 
Type of bridge: - Steel-deck bascule bridge (drawbridge)
Construction started: July 16, 1955
Opened to traffic: - July 4, 1959
Length of bascule draw span: - 
Total length of bridge: - 
Width of bridge: - 
Number of traffic lanes: - 2 lanes
Width of roadway: - 
Clearance at center above mean high water: - 
Cost of original structure (including approaches): - $2,500,000

Replacement 
The Suffolk County Legislature approved $73 million in funding for a new bridge on Tuesday, June 11, 2019.  The new bridge is expected to have a 75- to 100-year life span.  The bridge will not be a drawbridge, but will be built with a  vertical clearance above the high water mark. The bridge will also have wider shoulders and sidewalks to better accommodate pedestrian traffic.  Construction is scheduled to begin in 2021, and should take two years to complete.  The federal government is funding 80 percent of the project's cost, with the county share, 20 percent, a release said.

See also 
Outer Barrier Islands
Great South Bay
Great South Bay Bridge
Patchogue Bay
Fire Island Wilderness
Fire Island Inlet Bridge
Moriches Bay

References

External links
Smith Point Bridge @ LIShore.org
Smith Point Bridge @ NYCROADS.com
Smith Point Bridge (South Shore Estuary Reserve Council)

Bridges on Long Island
Brookhaven, New York
Road bridges in New York (state)
Steel bridges in the United States
Bascule bridges in the United States
Bridges in Suffolk County, New York